White Plains is a city in Greene County, Georgia, United States. The population was 284 at the 2010 census.

History
The Georgia General Assembly incorporated White Plains in 1834. According to tradition, White Plains was so named on account of the local white sandy soil.

Geography

White Plains is located in southeastern Greene County at  (33.477002, -83.038404). The southeast border of the city follows the Hancock County line. Georgia State Route 15 (Old Greensboro Road) passes through the center of town, leading north  to Siloam and south  to Sparta.

Demographics

As of the census of 2000, there were 283 people, 108 households, and 72 families residing in the city. The racial makeup of the city was 55.83% White and 44.17% African American. Hispanic or Latino of any race were 3.18% of the population.

There were 108 households, out of which 32.4% had children under the age of 18 living with them, 41.7% were married couples living together, 23.1% had a female householder with no husband present, and 33.3% were non-families. 26.9% of all households were made up of individuals, and 13.9% had someone living alone who was 65 years of age or older.  The average household size was 2.62 and the average family size was 3.28.

In the city, the population was spread out, with 25.8% under the age of 18, 9.9% from 18 to 24, 31.1% from 25 to 44, 21.9% from 45 to 64, and 11.3% who were 65 years of age or older.  The median age was 35 years. For every 100 females, there were 87.4 males.  For every 100 females age 18 and over, there were 85.8 males.

The median income for a household in the city was $33,906, and the median income for a family was $36,136. Males had a median income of $22,143 versus $15,781 for females. The per capita income for the city was $12,328.  About 16.3% of families and 24.6% of the population were below the poverty line, including 36.6% of those under the age of eighteen and 20.9% of those 65 or over.

References

Cities in Georgia (U.S. state)
Cities in Greene County, Georgia